Herbert Rosendorfer (19 February 1934, in Bolzano – 20 September 2012, in Eppan, South Tyrol) was a German jurist, writer, historian, and composer.

Biography
Herbert Rosendorfer was born in the village of Gries (currently in the province of Bolzano) in the South Tyrol. From 1939 to 1943, he lived in Munich. In 1943, he was evacuated to Kitzbühel, returning to Munich five years later.

After finishing school, Rosendorfer spent a year studying painting at the Academy of Fine Arts, Munich but then entered the Faculty of Law at the University of Munich.

Between 1967 and 1993, Rosendorfer served as a judge in Munich, after which he was a Justice at the High Court of Appeal in Naumburg. Also, from 1990, he was an honorary professor of the history of Bavarian literature at the University of Munich.

Following his retirement, he lived in Eppan, in the South Tyrol, till his death on 20 September 2012.

Awards and distinctions

Rosendorfer was a member of the Bavarian Academy of Fine Arts, as well as the Academy of Sciences and Literature (Akademie der Wissenschaften und der Literatur) in Mainz. He received the 1977 Toucan Prize, the 1991 Ernst Hoferichter Award, the 1992 Upper Bavarian Cultural Prize, the 1999 Jean-Paul Prize, and the 2010 Corine Literature Prize for his lifetime achievements.

He was honoured with the Order of Merit, First Class (1996), the Austrian Cross of Honour for Science and Art, 1st class and the Bavarian Order of Merit in 2004.

Works

Rosendorfer penned numerous novels and short stories, as well as plays, TV scripts, historical research, and treatises and guides on music. Some of his works belong in the genre of fantasy; even in his works of realism and history, he often used elements of satire and the grotesque.

He was a painter and composer, and combined his passion for literature and music in several librettos for the opera.

Books
The following books are available in English translation from Dedalus Books.

 (Original title - Der Ruinenbaumeister (1969))
 (Original title - Stephanie und das vorige Leben (1977))
 (Original title - Briefe in die chinesische Vergangenheit (1983))
 (Original title - Großes Solo für Anton (1976))

Another title was published in English translation by Martin Secker & Warburg in 1991.

The Night of the Amazons. Trans, Ian Mitchell (original title - Nacht der Amazonen (1989))

Music
 Two Marches, opus 7 for piano with four hands, Munich, 1999
 Musical Moments, opus 8a for flute and piano, Munich, 2000
 Musical Moments, opus 8b for oboe and piano, Munich, 2000
 Glory and Honour to the city of Passau, opus 9 for oboe (flute), clarinet and bassoon, Munich, 2000
 Two songs, opus 10 No. 1 and 2 for mezzo-soprano and chamber orchestra, Munich, 2000
 The Twelve Apostles of Rohrdorf; first performed December 1, 2005 at the Benedictine school in Ettal
 Concerto in D major for oboe and chamber orchestra, opus 14, 2008.

References

External links

1934 births
2012 deaths
Writers from Bolzano
Officers Crosses of the Order of Merit of the Federal Republic of Germany
Recipients of the Austrian Cross of Honour for Science and Art, 1st class
German male novelists
20th-century German novelists
20th-century German male writers
German television writers
Musicians from Bolzano
Deutscher Fantasy Preis winners